Bolivia has issued revenue stamps since 1867.

See also
Postage stamps and postal history of Bolivia

References

Further reading
Akerman, C. (1995) Collecting and displaying revenue stamps. Hitchin: Revenue Society of Great Britain. .
Akerman, C. (2002) The presentation of revenue stamps: Taxes and duties in South America. The Revenue Society of Great Britain.
Morley, W. (1904) Catalogue of the revenue stamps of South America. Being a supplement to Morley's Philatelic Journal, 1901-04. London: Walter Morley.

Philately of Bolivia
Economy of Bolivia
Bolivia